The Tweed GT-1 is an American high-wing, FAI Open Class single seat glider that was designed by George Tweed Jr.

Design and development

The GT-1 was built in concert with the Whigham GW-1 as both builders shared ideas and tools. The GT-1 first flew in 1960.

The lower part of the GT-1's nose was constructed from a drop tank, with the upper part fabricated from fiberglass that was laid up using the drop tank as a mold. The landing gear is a retractable monowheel. The aircraft was initially fitted with a bubble canopy. Later, the fuselage was modified to allow a more reclined pilot seating position and the canopy replaced with a more streamlined one. The modifications added  to the glider's empty weight and the gross weight was raised  in partial compensation. The GT-1's  span wing employs a NACA 43012A airfoil. The initial glide ratio was 29:1, but extensive work gap-filling and contouring the aircraft raised this to 33:1.

Only one GT-1 was built and the aircraft was registered in the Experimental - Amateur-Built category.

Operational history

The GT-1 was entered in the 1960 US Nationals, but, as the designer termed it, the aircraft "proved to be a victim of technical obsolescence" and it did not place well. Both the designer and Jack Green did however complete their gold badges in the glider.

By 2011 the aircraft had had its Federal Aviation Administration registry revoked and the aircraft likely no longer exists.

Specifications (GT-1 later configuration)

See also

References

External links

1960s United States sailplanes
Homebuilt aircraft
Aircraft first flown in 1960